El Peñón is a town in the Barahona province of the Dominican Republic.

Sources 
World Gazeteer: Dominican Republic – World-Gazetteer.com

Populated places in Barahona Province
Municipalities of the Dominican Republic